Louise Michel is a 1971 biography of Louise Michel by Édith Thomas. Originally published by Gallimard in French, Penelope Williams translated the biography into English in 1980.

References 

 
 
 
 
 
 

1971 non-fiction books
French-language books
Translations into English
Éditions Gallimard books
Biographies about anarchists